McQuillan GAC Ballycastle (Irish: MacUílín CLG Baile an Chaisleáin) is a Gaelic Athletic Association club located in the town of Ballycastle in County Antrim, Northern Ireland. The club is affiliated with the Antrim county board. The club participates in both hurling and Gaelic football but is known primarily for its hurling successes. They play their home matches at Páirc MacUílín which has also hosted the Antrim Senior Hurlers in recent years due to the ongoing redevelopment of Casement Park. The Club is sponsored by Parker Transport a local business in the town.

History
The club was founded in 1907. The name McQuillan originated from the ancient local clan McQuillan of whom Rory McQuillan who built Bonamargy Friary for the Franciscans and Julia McQuillan the Black Nun were members, their motto was death before dishonour.

Amongst the earliest hurlers to line out in the black and amber were John O`Brien (barber), James O`Mullan, Eneas Savage, David J O`Connor, John Jennings, John and Pat Barton, Pat Duffin, Paddy McHenry, Edward J (Joe) Donnelly (son of Edward), James and John Cairns, Daniel McNeill, John McClements, James Barton, Joseph McAlister, Bob Dillon and Hugh McGill (trainer), sadly all have now answered the final whistle.

Hurling

Since its inception over 100 years ago McQuillan GAC has made a huge contribution to the tradition of hurling encouraging and nurturing the ancient art and providing a steady stream of hurlers to represent club, county and nation. The club won its first title the North Antrim Senior Hurling Championship in 1909 and its first County Senior Hurling Championship in 1913.
 
McQuillan GAC is the only Antrim club to have received two All Star Awards and club players were elected all star replacements on a further six occasions. Club players represented Ireland in various other capacities on six additional occasions. Fifteen club players have represented Antrim in All Ireland Finals; seven at senior grade and three were selected on the 1984 Team of the Century.
 
Locally known as "The Town", they were the first Antrim team to complete two "hat tricks" of wins in 1952–54, and 1978–80. Eddie Donnelly's eight championship medals is a club record and ranks highly in the County. In 1980 McQuillan GAC were the first Antrim team to contest an All Ireland Club Final. In 1986 McQuillan GAC made a clean sweep of County Senior and Senior Reserve Championships and League titles along with the Ulster Club Hurling Championship.
 
The club continues to place a high priority on the development of its young players and history testifies to the benefits of previous similar policies. In the 1940s shortly after Seamus Clarke introduced Minor Hurling to North Antrim, McQuillan GAC claimed 6 Minor Titles and these players graduated to win 6 Senior Titles during the 1940s and '50s. A similar policy was with the Feile Na Gael Teams in the 1970s, one of which in 1975 contested the All Ireland Div 2 final, produced 3 Minor Titles and 8 Senior Titles during the 1970s and 80s.

The club currently compete in the Antrim Senior Hurling Championship and Division 1 in the Antrim County Hurling League. The Senior Reserve team take part in the Division 1 Reserve League.

Notable players
 Brian Donnelly
 Cormac Donnelly
 Dessie Donnelly
 Terence Donnelly
 Ryan McGarry
 Paul McKillen

Gaelic football

McQuillan GAC compete in the Antrim Junior Football Championship, and in Division 3 of the All-County Football League, finishing in third place in 2014. "The Town" have won the Antrim Junior Football Championship on one occasion, in 1934.

The club also won the Antrim County Football League Division 6 title in 2008 and have won North Antrim Junior Football Feis titles in 2006, 2008, 2009, 2010 and 2011.

Honours

Hurling
All-Ireland Club Senior Hurling Championship (0)
Runners-up 1980
Ulster Senior Club Hurling Championship (6) 
1978, 1979, 1980, 1983, 1984, 1986
Antrim Senior Hurling Championship (17) 
1913, 1914, 1933, 1944, 1948, 1950, 1952, 1953, 1954, 1964, 1975, 1978, 1979, 1980, 1983, 1984, 1986
Antrim Under-21 Hurling Championship (3)
2007, 2010, 2012
Antrim Minor Hurling Championship (12)
1929, 1940, 1941, 1942, 1946, 1948, 1965, 1967, 1973, 1977, 1978, 1990
Antrim Junior Hurling Championship (1)
1980
Antrim Senior Reserve Hurling Championship (2)
1986, 2012
North Antrim Senior Hurling Championship (10)
1909, 1910, 1912, 1913, 1914, 1915, 1932, 1933, 1934, 1944
North Antrim Junior Hurling Championship (12)
1916, 1934, 1960, 1965, 1966, 1968, 1974, 1977, 1980, 1993, 1996, 2001
North Antrim Senior Reserve Hurling Championship (2)
1985, 1986
North Antrim Minor Hurling Championship (23)
1929, 1932, 1940, 1941, 1942, 1943, 1944, 1947, 1948, 1954, 1956, 1964, 1965, 1967, 1968, 1970, 1972, 1973, 1974, 1977, 1978, 1989, 1990

Football
Antrim Junior Football Championship (1)
1934 
North Antrim Junior Football Championship (6)
1932, 1933, 1934, 1974, 1977, 1979
North Antrim Minor Football Championship (2)
1947, 1948

All Star Awards

All-Ireland Senior Hurling Championship – GAA GPA All Stars Awards 
Dessie Donnelly (1989)
Paul McKillen (1993)

All-Ireland Senior Hurling Championship – GAA GPA All Stars Awards Replacements
Eddie Donnelly (1975, 1977)
Brian Donnelly (1985)
Dessie Donnelly (1987)
Paul McKillen (1988)

All-Ireland Under-21 Hurling Championship – Bord Gáis Energy Team of the Year
Ciaran Clarke (2013)
Stephen McAfee (2013)

Christy Ring Cup Champion 15 Awards
Ciaran Clarke (2016)

Antrim GAA – Hurling Team of the Century (1884–1984)
Peter Boyle (1984)
John Butler (1984)
Eddie Donnelly (1984)

Achievements

All Star Awards

 Two McQuillan players have received All Star Awards, Dessie Donnelly (1989) and Paul McKillen (1993). Dessie also captained the team in their exhibition game against Tipperary in the SkyDome, Toronto.
 Eddie Donnelly (1975, 1977), Brian Donnelly (1985), Dessie Donnelly (1987) and Paul McKillen (1988) were selected to tour North America with the All Stars.

Ireland Representatives

 Robbie Elliot played at full forward for Ireland against the Combined Universities in 1954
 John Butler played midfield for Ireland against Britain in 1936
 Eddie Donnelly (1976, 1977), Ronan Donnelly (1994), Ciaran Kelly (2002), Cormac Donnelly (2012) and Neal McAuley (2014, 2015) represented Ireland in Senior Hurling /Shinty Internationals. Neal McAuley (2006), Stephen McAfee (2013), Ciaran Clarke (2013) and Matthew Donnelly (2013) have represented Ireland in the U-21 Hurling/Shinty International.

Inter County honours

 Three past players were named on the 1984 Antrim Team of the Century, John Butler, Eddie Donnelly and Peter Boyle
 McQuillan GAC had four representatives on the Antrim team which contested the 1989 All Ireland Final with Tipperary, Paul McKillen, Brian, Dessie and Terence Donnelly
 John Butler played on the Antrim team which lost the 1943 All Ireland Final to Cork, John McNeill and Donal Boylan were in the reserves
 McQuillan GAC had three representatives on the Antrim team which won the 1970 All Ireland Intermediate Title, Paddy McShane, Eddie and Kevin Donnelly
 Eight club players won All Ireland "B” Championship medals in 1978, 1981 and 1982. Peter and Stephen Boyle and Brian, Dessie, Eddie, Kevin, Seamus and Terence Donnelly.
 James Butler and Frank Fleming played on the Antrim team which lost the 1940 All Ireland Minor Final to Limerick
 Stephen McAfee, Matthew Donnelly and Ciaran Clarke were all members of the Antrim U21 Hurling squad that defeated Wexford in the 2013 All-Ireland Semi-final. This side were the first Ulster representatives to reach the final at this level. All three then took part in Antrim's first All-Ireland final appearance since 1989 in the defeat to Clare at Semple Stadium.
 Stephen McAfee also won the UGAAWA Merit Award trophy for his display as well as man of the match in the semi-final.
 In the same year Ciaran Clarke and Stephen McAfee were named on the Bord Gáis Energy Team of the Year of the year, the equivalent of All Stars at U21 level.

All-Ireland Poc Fada Competition

 Dessie Donnelly twice won the All Ireland Poc Fada Pairs competition partnering Christy Ryan of Clare in 1987 and Tommy Quaid of Limerick in 1990.

County, Provincial and National Championships

 In 1980 McQuillan GAC were the first Antrim team to contest an All Ireland Club Final, losing narrowly to Castlegar of Galway.
 McQuillan GAC have for some time held the record number of County Senior Championship wins they currently hold seventeen titles.
 In 1952–1954 and 1978–1980 the club were the first Antrim team to win two "hat tricks" of Senior Championships wins
 McQuillan GAC appeared in all eight championship finals between 1977 and 1984 winning five titles. Dermie Donnelly was team manager for 9 years from 1977 to 1985 inclusive
 Dessie Donnelly played in 15 championship finals from 1975 to 2001 playing in goals, backs and forwards and winning 7 medals.
 McQuillan GAC hold 10 league titles seven of which were won undefeated.
 The 1987 League win marked 5 league titles in a row, unbeaten in league 4 years in a row and unbeaten at home for 10 years in all official competitions within Ulster from 1978 to 1987 seasons inclusive.
 In 1986 McQuillan GAC won the County Senior Championship and League, County Senior Reserve Championship and League and the Ulster Club Championship.
 Eddie Donnelly's eight Antrim Senior Championship medals is a club record and ranks highly in the county, he also won eight league medals.
 In recent years the club has been relatively successful in the U21 Hurling Championship winning three of the last eight titles in 2007, 2010 and 2012. This was followed up by a Senior Reserve Hurling Championship title in 2012.
 McQuillan GAC also hold a county football title, the 1934 Antrim Junior Football Championship. The club is the most successful side in the Junior Football Feis Cup, winning five of the last nine, including the inaugural title in 2006.

References

External links
 Club website

Gaelic games clubs in County Antrim
Hurling clubs in County Antrim
Ballycastle, County Antrim